The 2021 Los Cabos Open (also known as the Mifel Open for sponsorship reasons) was an ATP tennis tournament played on outdoor hard court. It was the 5th edition of the tournament, and part of the ATP Tour 250 series of the 2021 ATP Tour. It took place in Los Cabos, Mexico from 19 July through 25 July 2021.

Champions

Singles 

  Cameron Norrie def.  Brandon Nakashima 6–2, 6–2.

Doubles 

  Hans Hach Verdugo /  John Isner def.  Hunter Reese /  Sem Verbeek 5–7, 6–2, [10–4].

Points and prize money

Point distribution

Prize money 

*per team

Singles main-draw entrants

Seeds 

 Rankings are as of July 12, 2021.

Other entrants
The following players received wildcards into the main draw:
  Ivo Karlović
  Thanasi Kokkinakis
  Gerardo López Villaseñor

The following players received entry from the qualifying draw:
  Matthew Ebden
  Ernesto Escobedo
  Nicolás Mejía
  Alexander Sarkissian

Withdrawals
  Kevin Anderson → replaced by  Elias Ymer
  Ričardas Berankis → replaced by  Jurij Rodionov
  Grigor Dimitrov → replaced by  Brandon Nakashima
  James Duckworth → replaced by  Yasutaka Uchiyama
  Daniel Elahi Galán → replaced by  Emilio Gómez
  Egor Gerasimov → replaced by  Evgeny Donskoy
  Ilya Ivashka → replaced by  Sebastian Ofner
  Sebastian Korda → replaced by  Peter Gojowczyk
  Adrian Mannarino → replaced by  J. J. Wolf
  Guido Pella → replaced by  Alex Bolt

Retirements
  Jurij Rodionov

Doubles main-draw entrants

Seeds

1 Rankings are as of 12 July 2021.

Other entrants
The following pairs received wildcards into the doubles main draw:
  Ernesto Escobedo /  Luis Patiño
  Mackenzie McDonald /  Sam Querrey

Withdrawals
Before the tournament
  Marcelo Arévalo /  Miguel Ángel Reyes-Varela → replaced by  Harri Heliövaara /  Miguel Ángel Reyes-Varela
  Ričardas Berankis /  Harri Heliövaara → replaced by  Sriram Balaji /  Luca Margaroli
  Lloyd Glasspool /  Cameron Norrie → replaced by  Evgeny Donskoy /  Illya Marchenko
  Matt Reid /  Jordan Thompson → replaced by  Alex Bolt /  Jordan Thompson
During the tournament
  Alex Bolt /  Jordan Thompson

References

External links 
 

Los Cabos Open
Los Cabos Open
2021
Los Cabos Open